NS21, NS 21, NS-21, NS.21, or variation, may refer to:

Places
 Newton MRT station (station code: NS21), Newton, Singapore; a mass transit station
 Nissei-chuo Station (station code: NS21), Inagawa, Hyōgo, Japan; a train station
 Eastern Shore (electoral district) (constituency N.S. 21), Nova Scotia, Canada; a provincial electoral district

Other uses
 New Penguin Shakespeare volume 21

See also

 NS (disambiguation)
 21 (disambiguation)